Ridgely Gaither (February 23, 1903 – October 26, 1992) was a United States Army lieutenant general prominent as commander of the 40th Infantry Division during the Korean War, and commander of the XVIII Airborne Corps, U.S. Army Caribbean Command and Second United States Army.

Early life
Gaither was born in Baltimore, Maryland, on February 23, 1903 to a family which included Army officers since the American Revolution and is the namesake of Gaithersburg, Maryland.  Gaither graduated from St. John's College in Annapolis and received his commission as a second lieutenant of Infantry in 1924.

Military career
Gaither served in positions of increasing responsibility and rank, including assignments in the continental United States, Alaska, Hawaii and China. He graduated from the Infantry Officer Course in 1933 and the Command and General Staff College in 1939.

World War II
An early advocate of using paratroopers in offensive military operations, from 1943 to 1944 Gaither commanded the Army Parachute School, receiving promotion to brigadier general.

While there, he was instrumental in forming the 555th Parachute Infantry Battalion ("Triple Nickels"), a segregated unit which was the U.S. Army's first African-American paratrooper unit.

In 1945, Gaither went to Europe to take part in fighting against Nazi Germany, including a combat parachute jump with the 17th Airborne Division.  He landed east of the Rhine River, almost on top of a German anti-aircraft battery. The Americans took the position, and Gaither said later that one group of Germans might have been taken prisoner sooner if he had not shot down their white flag of surrender, which was so dirty he did not immediately recognize it.

Later in 1945, General Gaither was assigned as assistant division commander of the 86th Infantry Division in the Philippines, where he served until the end of the war and immediately afterwards.

Interbellum
From 1946 until 1949, Gaither served as assistant division commander of the 88th Infantry Division, with duty on the border between Italy and Yugoslavia.  He also served as a member of the Allied commission that established the border, military governor of Trieste, and as president of the War Crimes Court in Florence, Italy.

Gaither commanded the 82nd Airborne Division from July to October, 1949.

From 1949 to 1951, Gaither served in the Operations Division of the Office of the Army's Deputy Chief of Staff for Operations.

Gaither commanded the 11th Airborne Division from 1951 to 1953.

Korean War
General Gaither was commander of the 40th Infantry Division from 1953 to 1954 and saw combat during the Battle of Heartbreak Ridge.

Senior command
In 1955, Gaither was assigned as commander of the XVIII Airborne Corps.

From 1955 to 1956, Gaither served as the U.S. Army's assistant chief of staff for Intelligence, G-2, and was promoted to lieutenant general.

Gaither was deputy commander of the Continental Army Command from 1957 to 1958, with duty as commander of Army Reserve Forces.

From 1958 to 1960 Gaither was commander of the U.S. Army Caribbean Command.  He became a hereditary member of the Maryland Society of the Cincinnati in 1960.

Gaither was assigned as commander of the Second United States Army in 1960, where he remained until his retirement in 1962.

Retirement and awards
Gaither retired from the army in 1962. His awards included two Army Distinguished Service Medals, two Silver Stars, the Legion of Merit and the Bronze Star Medal.

Gaither lived in Annapolis, where he was commissioner of police from 1966 to 1973.

Gaither died of congestive heart failure on October 26, 1992 at the Fairfield Nursing Center in Annapolis.

Services were conducted at St. Anne's Episcopal Church, in Annapolis, followed by burial at Arlington National Cemetery.  He is interred at Section 2, Site 4888-1.

References

External links
Generals of World War II

1903 births
1992 deaths
United States Army personnel of the Korean War
United States Army Command and General Staff College alumni
Recipients of the Distinguished Service Medal (US Army)
Recipients of the Silver Star
Recipients of the Legion of Merit
People from Annapolis, Maryland
Burials at Arlington National Cemetery
United States Army generals of World War II
United States Army generals
Military personnel from Baltimore